The Human Factor is a 1979 British neo noir film starring Nicol Williamson, Robert Morley, and Richard Attenborough, and directed and produced by Otto Preminger. It is based on the 1978 novel The Human Factor by Graham Greene, with the screenplay written by Tom Stoppard. It examines British espionage, and the difficulty of ferreting out a mole in one's intelligence service ranks. 

This was Preminger's last film.

Plot
Maurice Castle (Nicol Williamson) is a well-bred, mid-level bureaucrat in MI6 whose life seems unremarkable, apart from the fact that he has an African wife, Sarah (Iman), and son, Sam (Gary Forbes). The company regime, represented by éminence grise Dr. Percival (Robert Morley) and agency higher-up Sir John Hargreaves (Richard Vernon), advise newly appointed security chief Daintry (Richard Attenborough) that analysis of intel from a double-agent they have planted in Moscow indicates there is a leak in Castle's department. The info being shared with the KGB is trivial, but one never knows where things may lead.

The duo determine the mole must be identified and quietly eliminated, rather than be allowed publicity in a trial or defection to Moscow. They quickly decide the most likely candidate for the traitor is Arthur Davis (Derek Jacobi), Castle's red brick–educated playboy office partner.

Percival plants a seemingly tantalizing intelligence tidbit with Davis (which he and Hargreaves assume will be passed on only to the Soviets) as a means of smoking him out. Instead, unraveled by the intensive security scrutiny he's being subjected to, and utterly clueless why, Davis idly shares it with Castle. When the telltale bait shows up in Moscow Percival concludes with myopic certainty Davis was its source. An expert in assassinations and biological toxins, the doctor then injects a hungover, bed-ridden Davis with a toxin that makes it appear the man's liver had given out from alcoholism.

Castle is given the task of hosting an old nemesis from his days being posted in apartheid South Africa seven years earlier, chief intelligence officer Muller. It was he, it is revealed, who had tormented Castle after Castle met and fell in love with Sarah. Operating under his cover as a writer Castle had been tasked by MI6 with observing the local Communist movement. He befriended its white leader, Matthew Connolly (Tony Vogel), who introduced him to the beautiful, sophisticated Bantu, Sarah. The couple fell for one-another and soon became intimate. Caught in a South African surveillance sting intended to compromise him into doing Muller's bidding, Castle fled the country to avoid arrest and exposure, then awaited Sarah - pregnant by a previous, then-deceased boyfriend - being smuggled to him by Connolly.

Ever since Castle has been repaying the favor by passing information on to the Soviets via a contact in London, and flinches when Muller casually drops that Connolly had recently "accidentally" died in police custody. Shortly after he learns in an agency briefing given by Muller of a plan for the South Africans to use U.S.-supplied tactical nuclear weapons to eradicate the nation's Communist insurgents en masse. Although he is not a Communist, Castle feels compelled as a humanitarian to pass a warning on to Moscow, no matter the risk of shining MI6's counterintelligence security spotlight on himself.

He does. Seeking to stay one step ahead of Percival and Daintry, he surrenders himself into the hands of underground Communist operatives in Britain, who successfully smuggle him to safety in the Soviet Union. Having received assurances from his handler that his wife and child would soon join him there, he grows impatient when he learns that MI6 is preventing them being allowed to leave Britain. Ultimately a passport complication is trumped to force Sarah to choose between her husband and son.

Desperate, despondent, and isolated, Castle is reduced to a powerless pawn by the Soviets. He soon is to be forced by them to appear in a press conference both announcing his defection and denouncing the "Uncle Remus" nuclear ambush plan. His two worst fates - losing his wife and child, and not only forfeiting his career and nation but being coerced into representing himself as both a Communist and a traitor when he never intended to be either - close in on him like the jaws of a vice. He is so overcome to hear from Sarah that she cannot, will not come, he is unable even to hang up the phone when their connection is lost. He collapses in anguish as its receiver swings like a pendulum from its cord, foreshadowing the approaching end of his rope.

Cast

Production
The film was shot in Kenya and at Shepperton and Pinewood Studios near London as well as on location at Berkhamsted. As with the book, much of the theme about alleged treason and suspicion is based on the defection of Kim Philby, a friend of Graham Greene's, to the Soviets. Iman, an internationally known model, was introduced as an actress in the picture's opening credits.

Preminger had trouble securing funding for the picture and had to partially finance it with his own money. According to The Daily Telegraph obituary of casting director Rose Tobias Shaw, Preminger wanted to cast the novelist Jeffrey Archer in the role eventually played by Nicol Williamson. Archer, however, was much shorter than the  Iman, and failed his audition.

Release
The film was the first acquisition by Metro-Goldwyn-Mayer in six years for distribution in the United States and Canada, through United Artists. The film was released for an Academy Awards qualifying run in Los Angeles as well in New York City.

Reception
The film holds a 33% on Rotten Tomatoes, based on six reviews.

References

External links
 
 
 
 

1979 films
1970s spy films
British spy films
Cold War spy films
British thriller drama films
Films directed by Otto Preminger
Films based on works by Graham Greene
United Artists films
Films based on British novels
Films with screenplays by Tom Stoppard
1979 romantic drama films
1970s thriller drama films
Films shot in Buckinghamshire
Films shot at Pinewood Studios
Films shot at Shepperton Studios
Films set in London
Films shot in Hertfordshire
Films shot in Kenya
Apartheid films
Films about the Secret Intelligence Service
1970s English-language films
1970s British films